Airflow Sciences Corporation (ASC) is an engineering consulting company based in Livonia, Michigan, USA that specializes in the design and optimization of equipment and processes involving flow, heat transfer, combustion, and mass transfer.  Engineering techniques include Computational Fluid Dynamics (CFD) modeling, experimental laboratory testing, and field measurements at client sites. ASC works for a wide range of industries world-wide, including power generation, manufacturing, aerospace, HVAC, food processing, biomedical, pollution control, oil & gas, rail, legal, and automotive.

In addition to engineering consulting, ASC has a test equipment division that manufactures flow measurement equipment such as data loggers, pressure/flow/temperature instrumentation, wind tunnels, and online flow systems.

ASC is the parent company of Azore Software, LLC, which develops and sells the commercial simulation software AzoreCFD.  This advanced polyhedral-based CFD software use widely used for flow and heat transfer analysis and design.

History
The company was founded in 1975 by Robert Gielow and James Paul, two Professional Engineers with backgrounds in the aerospace industry.  They quickly realized that the analysis techniques they applied to projects such as the Apollo program moon rockets and commercial aircraft design could be used to advance a wide variety of other industries.  Early years of the company were focused on aerodynamic optimization of vehicles such as cars, tractor trailers, and rail cars to minimize drag and fuel consumption.  This work involved both wind tunnel testing and numerical simulation.

In the 1970s and 1980s, ASC developed a range of simulation software for potential flow and viscous flow analysis, writing its own CFD solver (VISCOUS).  The capabilities of this cartesian-based CFD software eventually included advanced physics such as combustion, particulate transport and drying simulations, time-dependence, and convection/conduction/radiation heat transfer.  In the 1990s and early 2000s, ASC personnel developed a new CFD software package, AzoreCFD, featuring a modern, polyhedral based solver in order to analyze highly complex geometries and physics.  Azore development continues with new features and simulations capabilities incorporated to allow more unique flow problems to be analyzed.

In addition to simulation of flow and heat transfer, ASC has advanced its field testing capabilities on a regular basis over the years.  Many of the tests ASC is requested to perform are new or unique, requiring development and fabrication of custom flow measurement equipment.  Today's testing capabilities include velocity, temperature, pressure, particulate sampling, gas species and emissions, and more.

Problems Solved by ASC
ASC works with its customer's to solve problems involving the flow of fluids (gases or liquids) in or around a wide variety of equipment or goods.  Some problems include simply the flow itself.  These include such things as reducing pressure drop, eliminating flow induced vibrations, or ensuring uniform flow through an equipment that processes elements of the flow.  Since fluid flow carries energy, heat transfer problems such as improving thermal mixing or heating/cooling characteristics are often solved.  Similarly, ASC undertakes many problems involving the pneumatic transport of particulate and droplets.  The chemical reactions in a flowing gas or liquid are also the subject of ASC studies.  Methods used to solve these problems include: Numerical simulation (including Computational fluid dynamics), Wind tunnel testing, Laboratory modeling (including Scale models), and Flow measurement/Field testing.

Customer Base
ASC customers include manufacturing and processing firms from a wide variety of industries, including:
 Electricity / power generation
 Renewable energy
 Food processing
 Manufacturing 
 Metals processing / heat treating
 Heating, Ventilation, and Air Conditioning (HVAC) of buildings
 Cement and mineral production and mining
 Pulp and paper
 Sporting equipment Aerodynamics
 Steel producers
 Automotive industry and auto racing companies
 Class I railroads and railcar manufacturers
 Biotechnology firms

ASC has performed over 4000 engineering studies worldwide since 1975.

External links
Airflow Sciences Corporation web site
Airflow Sciences Equipment Division web site
Azore CFD Software web site
ASC YouTube page
Airflow Sciences Equipment YouTube page
Azore YouTube page
ASC LinkedIn

Fluid dynamics
Companies based in Wayne County, Michigan
Engineering companies of the United States
Technology companies established in 1975